Chapo or El Chapo ("Shorty") may refer to:

Places
 Chapo Lake, in Chile

People
 El Chapo de Sinaloa (active 1995–present), Mexican singer 
 Joaquín "El Chapo" Guzmán (born 1957), Mexican former drug lord who headed the Sinaloa Cartel
 Pierre Chapo (1927–1987), French furniture designer
 Fausto Isidro Meza Flores ("El Chapo Isidro", born 1982), Mexican drug lord and high-ranking leader of the Beltrán Leyva Cartel
 El Chapo Montes (born 1986), Mexican association football player
 Edwin Rosario ("El Chapo", 1963–97), Puerto Rican boxer

Arts, entertainment, and media
 "El Chapo" (song), by The Game
 El Chapo (TV series), a TV series about the life of Joaquín Guzmán
 Chapo Trap House, an American politics and humor podcast

Other uses
Chapo (beverage), a Peruvian drink

See also

Charo (disambiguation)
El Chopo or Tianguis Cultural del Chopo, Saturday flea market near Mexico City downtown